Sabah Oil and Gas Terminal (SOGT) is a terminal located in Kimanis, Papar District, Sabah, Malaysia. The terminal handles the production of oil and gas from the West Coast Field in South China Sea facing the western coast of Sabah, which covering the operations of Sabah Gas Terminal, Labuan Crude Oil Terminal and the Labuan Gas Terminal. Covering an area of about 250 acres, with a capacity to handle up to 300,000 barrels of crude oil per day and 1.0 billion standard cubic feet of gas per day. The terminal stores oil before it is transported by tanker. The terminal is also connected to another terminal in neighbouring Sarawak through the Sabah–Sarawak Gas Pipeline.

History 
The proposal to build the terminal has been put forward since 2005. The ground-breaking was officiated by Prime Minister Abdullah Ahmad Badawi in 2007. In 2010, South Korean-company Samsung Engineering signed a $770 million contract with Petronas to jointly develop the project. A Sarawak-based Malaysian construction company, Naim Holdings Berhad also entered the joint venture with the project was finally complete in 2014.

References

External links 
 
 Sabah Oil and Gas Terminal

Oil terminals
Natural gas plants
Natural gas terminals
Buildings and structures in Sabah
Buildings and structures completed in 2014
Papar District